Jack Bartlett Rogers (January 23, 1934 – July 14, 2016) was an American Presbyterian minister and theologian. He taught at Westminster College, Pennsylvania, at Fuller Theological Seminary, and at San Francisco Theological Seminary. He also served as moderator of the 213th General Assembly of the Presbyterian Church (USA).

Publications
Worldcat lists 48 published works by Rogers. Among them are:
 The Authority and Interpretation of the Bible: An Historical Approach, (with Donald McKim)
 Biblical Authority
 Claiming the Center: Churches and Conflicting Worldviews
 Confessions of a Conservative Evangelical
 Introduction to Philosophy: A Case Method Approach (with Forrest Baird)
 Jesus, The Bible, and Homosexuality: Explode the Myths, Heal the Church
 Presbyterian Creeds: A Guide to the Book of Confessions
 Presbyterian Creeds: Supplement on the Brief Statement of Faith
 Reading the Bible and the Confessions: The Presbyterian Way

References

External links
 

1934 births
2016 deaths
20th-century American theologians
20th-century Calvinist and Reformed theologians
20th-century Presbyterian ministers
21st-century American theologians
21st-century Calvinist and Reformed ministers
21st-century Calvinist and Reformed theologians
American Calvinist and Reformed theologians
Presbyterian Church (USA) teaching elders
20th-century American clergy
21st-century American clergy